Sons of Norway, founded in 1895 as the Independent Order of the Sons of Norway, is a fraternal organization principally representing people of Norwegian heritage in the United States and Canada. The organization includes in its mission the promotion and preservation of the heritage and culture of Norway and other Nordic countries and to provide life insurance and other financial products to its members. The organization is classified as a non-profit 501(c)(8) fraternal beneficiary society.

Currently, the Sons of Norway has nearly 400 lodges in the United States, Canada, and Norway. With over 57,000 members, the Sons of Norway is the largest Norwegian organization outside of Norway.

History

Establishment

The Sons of Norway was founded as the Independent Order of the Sons of Norway.  The organization was founded by 18 members on January 16, 1895, in Minneapolis, Minnesota, to insure each other when they were unable to secure life insurance on their own. Membership was originally open to males of Norwegian descent between the ages of 20 and 50 who were capable of giving proof of being morally upright, in good health, and capable of supporting a family.

A second lodge was established in South Minneapolis in 1899 and a third was founded in the northeastern section of the city in 1900. The Minneapolis model quickly spread and by the end of 1900 some 12 lodges of the organization had been established in cities and towns with substantial Norwegian-American populations across the American Upper Midwest.

From its origins in Minnesota, the organization spread to both coasts. A lodge of the order was established as far away as the then American territory of Alaska.

In 1903 a group in Seattle asked the Midwestern group for a charter, however, they did not wish to have compulsory insurance for the members, which was anathema to the parent order. The Seattle group organized as Leif Erikson Lodge No. 1 in spite of the Midwest lodges and with other West Coast lodges set up the Grand Lodge of the Sons of Norway of the Pacific Coast. The two orders quarreled until they held a convention in Superior, Wisconsin in June 1909, merging the next year.

By the time of the outbreak of World War I in 1914, the Sons of Norway claimed a membership of about 12,000.

Development

Originally established as a secret order, most of the ritualistic aspects of the order were removed in the early part of the twentieth century at the request of the Rev. Hans Gerhard Stub, president of the Norwegian Lutheran Synod.

The organization published an official monthly magazine, Sønner av Norge (Sons of Norway), which kept members abreast of activities of the group. Other activities included regular lectures on historical, cultural, and literary topics; essay and speech contests for students; and organized festivities for various national Norwegian holidays. The Sons of Norway also worked to expand the instruction of the Norwegian language in public schools. As of the 2000s, the magazine is named "Viking".

1938 merger

In December 1938, the Sons of Norway absorbed the American auxiliary of The Knights of the White Cross Order (Riddere av Det Hvite Kors) which had been founded in Chicago in 1863.

Daughters of Norway 

Women were admitted to local groups as early as 1916, in areas where the female auxiliary was unorganized. Daughters of Norway lodges in the Midwest were merged with the Sons of Norway in 1950 and a system of junior lodges was created in 1956. The Grand Lodge of the Daughters of Norway, which dates to 1908, continues as a separate association.

Organization today 

The organization slowly expanded across the United States and includes lodges in Canada and Norway.  In the 2000s, Sons of Norway continued to make an effort to build on the traditions of the past while at the same time focusing on modern Norwegian–American lives.

Membership 

Membership is open to everyone with an interest in Norwegian or Norwegian–American culture. Currently, the Sons of Norway has nearly 400 lodges in the United States, Canada and Norway. There were 90,000 members in 1995, and 64,186 members in 2010.

Insurance benefits 

The benefits offered by the Sons of Norway have fluctuated over the years. They originally offered life, sickness and accident insurance but in 1934 restricted coverage to life insurance only. Gradually other benefits were restored.

Statistics
As of December 31, 2013:
 Total Members: 58,178
 Members in the United States: 54,435
 Members in Canada: 2,499
 Members in Norway: 1,244
 Lodges: 380
 Life Insurance In Force: $675,520,000
 Number Insurance Certificates in Force: 16,913
In 2013, Sons of Norway lodges and members gave more than 500,000 hours of volunteerism and $1 million to their communities. The Sons of Norway also maintains a large library of Nordic works and retirement home called Norse Home located in Seattle.

International conventions
The International Lodge Convention is held every two years, usually in August. Each District holds a convention every two years as well.

Here are the locations of recent international conventions:

 2022 – 66th Sons of Norway International Convention, Eagan, Minnesota
 2020 – 66th Sons of Norway International Convention, Ringsaker, Norway - postpone due to COVID-19 
 2018 – 65th Sons of Norway International Convention, Minneapolis, Minnesota
 2016 – 64th Sons of Norway International Convention, Tacoma, Washington
 2014 – 63rd Sons of Norway International Convention, Jacksonville, Florida
 2012 – 62nd Sons of Norway International Convention, Fargo, North Dakota
 2010 – 61st Sons of Norway International Convention, Coeur d'Alene, Idaho
 2008 – 60th Sons of Norway International Convention, San Diego, California
 2006 – 59th Sons of Norway International Convention. Vancouver, British Columbia, Canada
 2004 – 58th Sons of Norway International Convention, Washington D.C.
 2002 – 57th Sons of Norway International Convention, Madison, Wisconsin
 2000 – 56th Sons of Norway International Convention, Stavanger, Norway
 1998 – 55th Sons of Norway International Convention, Anaheim, California
 1996 – 54th Sons of Norway International Convention, unknown
 1994 – 53rd Sons of Norway International Convention, Saint Paul, Minnesota
 1992 – 52nd Sons of Norway International Convention, Lillehammer, Norway

Notable buildings
Some of the Sons of Norway's buildings are historic and/or are otherwise notable, including:
 Sons of Norway Building, 1455 W Lake St, Minneapolis, Minnesota The building was opened in 1962. In 2017, the building and surrounding two-acre land was sold to developers who will demolish it in order to develop the city block; the organization will move back in as an anchor tenant once it is complete.
 Sons of Norway Hall, Petersburg, Alaska, built 1912, listed on the National Register of Historic Places (NRHP)
 Sons of Norway building of Minot, North Dakota, built 1915, a contributing building in the NRHP-listed Minot Commercial Historic District

Footnotes

External links

 

Culture of Minneapolis
1895 establishments in Minnesota
Traditions
Lineage societies
Norwegian-American culture
Norwegian-Canadian culture
Norwegian migration to North America
Ethnic fraternal orders in the United States
Sons of Norway buildings
Organizations established in 1895